A floodplain swamp is a swamp habitat in Florida. They occur in areas of flooding and inundation along streams and rivers. They have a lot in common with strand swamps, found further south where lack of slope prevents stream formation and host a variety of plant and animal species. low land covered with slow moving animals.

References

Swamps of Florida